Brian Wright (born 5 October 1958 in Drumchapel) is a Scottish former football player and manager. Wright played for Hamilton Academical, Motherwell, Clydebank, Partick Thistle and Queen of the South. After retiring as a player he managed Clydebank.

References

1958 births
Living people
Footballers from Glasgow
Scottish footballers
Association football midfielders
Hamilton Academical F.C. players
Motherwell F.C. players
Clydebank F.C. (1965) players
Partick Thistle F.C. players
Queen of the South F.C. players
Scottish Football League players
Scottish football managers
Clydebank F.C. (1965) managers
Scottish Football League managers